No Shame Theatre is a forum for original stage performance work. It is often presented as a weekly talent show.

Format
A board of approximately five members generally manages No Shame Theatre. These members are responsible for the operation of No Shame Theatre- they reserve space, advertise, accept pieces from performers, decide the order of the pieces, and serve as emcees for the program. Usually, the program contains approximately fifteen pieces. It is stated at the beginning of the program that the pieces must be original, must be under five minutes, and must not damage the space or its occupants. However, these rules are occasionally bent and in some cases, broken. The pieces are not censored in any way, which leads to a strange mix of silly comedy, "unique" performance art, and emotional drama that is rarely seen in more conventional theatre.

History
No Shame Theatre was founded by Todd Ristau and Stan Ruth at the University of Iowa in Iowa City, Iowa. It began on October 3, 1986, in the back of a green 1976 Dodge pick-up truck belonging to Todd Ristau, and parked in the E. C. Mabie Theater parking lot.

A sign up sheet was posted in fall of 1986 to generate interest in No Shame. The sheet read:

"The No Shame Theatre is looking for a few good three to 5 minute scripts that would be suitable for performing in the bed of a pick-up truck in some parking lot someplace. If you have such material and are proud enough of it to want to see it done someplace we've got the perfect vehicle for your expression--a big green '76 Dodge with a slant six engine. To submit scripts for consideration, contact us or leave them along with your name and phone number in the cardboard box on top of the locker just outside and to the left (as you stand looking at) the door to the playwright's office downstairs. Please waste no time, we want to get this truck started. No Shame is at least as serious as you are."

The present
Since its creation, No Shame Theatres have been started throughout the United States. Branches of No Shame exist in the following locations:

Iowa City, Iowa; Cedar Falls, Iowa; Eugene, Oregon; Austin, Texas; Fort Myers, Florida; Miami Beach, Florida; Los Angeles, California; Columbus, Georgia;  Las Vegas, Nevada; Chicago, Illinois; Saint Louis, Missouri; La Crosse, Wisconsin; Roanoke, Virginia (started by Ristau in 2003 and where he still takes order and performs); Staunton, Virginia; Asheville, North Carolina; and Richmond, Virginia. The Roanoke Chapter, which has been a core component of Mill Mountain Theatre's second stage programming, has twice been invited to the Piccolo Spoleto Theatre Festival in Charleston, South Carolina.

Each location has different rules according to the decisions of their respective boards of directors. The rules usually consist of 1)Pieces must be original, 2) be under 5 minutes, and 3) they cannot damage the space or its occupants physically.

Over the last 19 years there have been other No Shame Theatres to come and go including those in New York, New York; Miami, Florida; Chicago, Illinois; Fairbanks, Alaska; Orlando, Florida; Charlottesville, Virginia (started by Ristau); Charleston, South Carolina; Ireland; Cutler Ridge, Florida; Verona; Portland, Oregon; Harrisonburg, Virginia; Newport News, Virginia; Columbus, Georgia; Great Falls, Montana; Treasure Coast; Carrboro, North Carolina.

Famous alumni
Actor Toby Huss got his start at No Shame Theatre in Iowa City, where he started his character Artie, the Strongest Man in the World.  Toby performed an Artie piece at the No Shame hosted by HOME for Contemporary Theatre and Art in New York City, and was seen by people who were developing the Adventures of Pete & Pete television show.  They hired Toby to incorporate the character into the series.

Actor John Leguizamo performed at No Shame Theatre in New York City while No Shame was hosted at HOME for Contemporary Theatre and Art in TriBeCa.  (44 Walker Street)  It was during this period that he developed portions of the play that would become Mambo Mouth. He has appeared in many films including Moulin Rouge!, Ice Age, and Romeo + Juliet.

Playwright Ruth Margraff performed at No Shames in Iowa City and the one at HOME.  Ruth has gone on to become a very successful writer and performance artist, and currently teaches playwriting at the School of the Institute of Art in Chicago.

Playwright Naomi Wallace frequently attended No Shame while doing her graduate work in the Playwright's Workshop in Iowa City, and first wrote for No Shame while in residence at Mill Mountain Theatre in Roanoke for the developmental production of her play Fever Chart.

Historian and Jeopardy! champion James L. Erwin performed at No Shame Theatre in Iowa City.

Actor Paul Rust performed at No Shame Theatre in Iowa City. He is featured in the film I Love You, Beth Cooper, has a role in the Quentin Tarantino film, Inglourious Basterds, and starred in the Netflix series Love (TV series).

See also
http://noshame.org/
https://www.facebook.com/noshametheateriowacity
http://noshame.org/iowacity/history.htm
http://www.ristentltd.com/index.html
http://www.noshamela.com

References
How To No Shame by Todd Wm. Ristau and Jeff Goode

Theatre companies in Iowa